H. A. Clark Memorial Field  is a public-use airport located in Williams, Arizona. The Federal Aviation Administration LID used to be P32.

Facilities and aircraft 
It has one runway:
 18/36 is 5,992 by 100 feet (2,036 x 30 m) with an asphalt surface.

For the 12-month period ending April 19, 2009, the airport had 7,500 general aviation aircraft operations, an average of 21 per day. At that time there were 15 aircraft based at this airport: all single-engine.

Accidents and incidents 
 On April 18, 2021 a 1946 Cessna 140, which was coming from Vista, California, crashed near the airport, killing the two occupants, 37 year old Timothy Michael Gill and 38 year old Joylani Roseann Kamalu. A later report said the airplane was coming from Sedona Airport in Sedona, Arizona, instead.

References

External links 

 

Airports in Coconino County, Arizona
Williams, Arizona